Chersobius solus, commonly known as the Nama dwarf tortoise, the Nama padloper, and Berger's cape tortoise, is a species of tortoise in the family Testudinidae. The species is endemic to Namibia.

Conservation status
C. solus is threatened by traffic on roads, habitat destruction, and poaching for the pet trade. As the trade in collected Chersobius  species is strictly illegal and any captive specimens are systematically registered in noncommercial studbooks in South Africa and Namibia, any commercial sale of Chersobius tortoises is almost without exception strictly illegal. Another threat comes from introduced species, such as domestic dogs and pigs.

In captivity
C. solus does not generally survive well in captivity unless some effort is made to supply specimens with their natural food, that is, endemic plants from the Cape/Karoo regions.

References

Chersobius
Reptiles described in 2007
Endemic fauna of Namibia
Reptiles of Namibia
Taxa named by William Roy Branch
Taxonomy articles created by Polbot